John Knowles (1781 – 21 July 1841) was the English biographer of Henry Fuseli, and author of works on Naval architecture.

Life
Knowles, born in 1781, early in life became a clerk in the surveyor's department of the navy office. He attained the chief clerkship there about 1806, and held this post until 1832. He published two or three works on naval matters, including The Elements and Practice of Naval Architecture, 1822. For his scientific researches he was elected a fellow of the Royal Society. Knowles is best known, however, from his long, intimate friendship with Henry Fuseli the painter, and the circle to which that artist belonged. He was the executor of Fuseli's will, and a devoted admirer of his art.

Knowles died, unmarried, at Ashburton, Devonshire, on 21 July 1841, aged 60. He was one of the original members of the Athenæum Club, and his portrait, drawn by Charles Landseer, is No. 25 of the series of lithographs, published as Athenæum Portraits, by Thomas McLean. He was corresponding member of the Philosophical Society of Rotterdam.

Works
In 1830 he published an edition of Fuseli's Lectures on Painting, and in 1831, in 3 vols. the life of Fuseli, written as a labour of love, to which was added an edition of the painter's writings on art.

References

Attribution

External links
 
 

1781 births
1841 deaths
English biographers
Fellows of the Royal Society
English male non-fiction writers
19th-century English writers
19th-century biographers
19th-century English male writers